WROF-LP (95.7 FM, "WROF 95.7 Radio of Floyd") is a radio station licensed to serve the community of Floyd, Virginia. The station is owned by Radio Free Floyd and airs a variety format.

The station was assigned the WROF-LP call letters by the Federal Communications Commission on February 10, 2014.

References

External links
 Official Website
 FCC Public Inspection File for WROF-LP
 

ROF-LP
ROF-LP
Radio stations established in 2017
2017 establishments in Virginia
Variety radio stations in the United States
Floyd County, Virginia